Rumba Parish is an administrative unit of Kuldīga Municipality in the Courland region of Latvia. The parish has a population of 1665 (as of 1/07/2010) and covers an area of 225.92 km2.

Villages of Rumba parish 
 Bauņi (Novadnieki)
 Dragūnciems
 Ēdas
 Griķi (Lejas)
 Ķīkciems
 Mežvalde
 Rumbenieki
 Veldze
 Venta

See also 
 Curonian Kings

External links 
 Rumba parish in Latvian

Parishes of Latvia
Kuldīga Municipality
Courland